Sean McAloon (1923–1998) was a piper and pipe maker from Northern Ireland. Originally from the Rosslea area of County Fermanagh, McAloon's first instrument was the fiddle.  However, he is best known as a master of the uilleann pipes. He emigrated to the United States in 1964, but after a year he returned to Ireland. He spent eight months working as a builder's labourer in Dublin, but moved to Belfast in 1966 to be closer to his family. There, he got a job working for the Corporation Parks Department.

His major inspirations as a piper were Phil Martin, whom he saw playing at a feis in Rosslea, and Leo Rowsome. In addition to being a fine player, McAloon eventually became a respected pipe repairer and a highly regarded reed-maker. He produced about twenty sets of the instrument in his lifetime. Desy McCabe from Craobh plays a McAloon half set

Discography 
Various artists, "Ulster's Flowery Vale", B.B.C. Radio Enterprises REC28M, no date (a compilation of traditional songs and music originally broadcast on the Northern Ireland Home Service, July and August 1968)
 John Rea & Sean McAloon, Drops of Brandy, Topic 12TS287, 1976
 Various artists, Irish Traditional Music, Temple COMD2079, 2000 (compilation culled from three Topic releases, including 12TS287)
 Sean McAloon, Stor Piobaireachta (Piping from the Archives), Na Píobairí Uilleann, 2004

References
Liner notes for Drops of Brandy
Vallely, Fintan (1999), The Companion to Irish Traditional Music, New York University Press. .

1923 births
1998 deaths
Uilleann pipers from Northern Ireland
Irish musical instrument makers
Musicians from County Fermanagh
20th-century musicians from Northern Ireland
Topic Records artists
Northern Ireland emigrants to the United States